{{Automatic_taxobox
| image = Parepisparis virgatus.jpg
| image_caption = Parepisparis virgatus
| taxon = Parepisparis
| authority = Bethune-Baker, 1906
| synonyms = *Gerusia Warren, 1907
| synonyms_ref = 
}}Parepisparis' is a genus of moths in the family Geometridae erected by George Thomas Bethune-Baker in 1906.

SpeciesParepisparis brevidactyla Scoble & Edwards, 1990Parepisparis dumigani Scoble & Edwards, 1990Parepisparis excusata (Walker, 1860)Parepisparis lutosaria (R. Felder & Rogenhofer, 1875)Parepisparis multicolora (Lucas, 1892)Parepisparis pallidus Scoble & Edwards, 1990Parepisparis rutila (Turner, 1947)Parepisparis virgatus'' Scoble & Edwards, 1990

References

Oenochrominae